Parliamentary elections were held in Gabon on 9 and 23 December 2001. The result was a victory for the ruling Gabonese Democratic Party, which won 86 of the 120 seats in the National Assembly.

Results

References

Elections in Gabon
Gabon
2001 in Gabon
Election and referendum articles with incomplete results
December 2001 events in Africa